Rafał Omelko (born 16 January 1989) is a retired Polish athlete who specialised in the 400 metres. He won two medals in the 4 × 400 metres relay at the European Athletics Championships.

Career
Omelko finished fourth at the 2013 Summer Universiade and reached the semifinals at the 2014 World Indoor Championships.

His personal bests in the event are 45.14 seconds outdoors (2016) and 46.08 indoors (2017).

Omelko and his teammates qualified to the 4 × 400 metres relay final at the 2016 Summer Olympics in Rio de Janeiro, Brazil.

The Polish quartet of Karol Zalewski, Rafał Omelko, Łukasz Krawczuk, Jakub Krzewina broke the world indoor record in the men's 4x400m with a stunning finish to the final track event of the 2018 World Indoor Championships in Birmingham. Krzewina overtook the leaders from the beginning - Americans on the last straight and achieved the greatest success in their career.

Competition record

†: Competed only in heat.

References

1989 births
Living people
Polish male sprinters
Sportspeople from Wrocław
World Athletics Championships athletes for Poland
European Athletics Championships medalists
Athletes (track and field) at the 2016 Summer Olympics
Olympic athletes of Poland
Universiade medalists in athletics (track and field)
Universiade bronze medalists for Poland
World Athletics Indoor Championships winners
Competitors at the 2013 Summer Universiade
Medalists at the 2015 Summer Universiade
Medalists at the 2017 Summer Universiade
21st-century Polish people